David Mbaihouloum (born 17 February 1989) is a Chadian footballer who plays as a midfielder for AS CotonTchad. He earned three caps for the Chad national football team. and was called up for qualifying matches for 2012 Africa Cup of Nations.

References

External links
 

1989 births
Living people
Chadian footballers
Association football midfielders
Chad international footballers